David M. Sherry (B.A., University of Montana, 1974; Ph.D., Claremont Graduate School, 1982) is a philosopher and professor at Northern Arizona University in Flagstaff, Arizona. He teaches History of Philosophy, History of Logic, as well as Philosophy of Mathematics.  He has published on Logic, Philosophy of Mathematics and Philosophy of Science.

Selected publications

External links
 http://cas.umt.edu/math/documents/newsletter/newsletter_2001-s.pdf

American philosophers
Northern Arizona University faculty
Living people
Year of birth missing (living people)